Leicester House may refer to:

Leicester House, the original name of Essex House (London), London, built c. 1575 and demolished in the 1670s
 Leicester House, Westminster, the house that Leicester Square is named after, built in the 1630s and demolished c. 1791